William Ayrton may refer to:

William Edward Ayrton (1847–1908), English physicist and electrical engineer
William Ayrton (music critic) (1777–1858), English musical writer